Red Square Black was a band formed by Mark Binder of Los Angeles. The band was an innovative force in the early 1990s playing the Los Angeles club scene. They melded metal, industrial sequencing and pop sensibilities. All songs were written and composed by Binder.

After several drummers and a band shake-up, a steady lineup was picked up by BMG label Zoo Entertainment, and rehearsals started for a tour. Binder teamed up with future Marilyn Manson / Rob Zombie guitar player John 5 to replace Paul Noble, who originally handled guitar duties, while adding former Ozzy Osbourne drummer Randy Castillo and bassist Angelo Barbera. The EP "Square" was released by Zoo Entertainment on October 11, 1994. After a short tour, the band split up.

Discography 
1994: Square (Zoo Entertainment)

Musical groups from Los Angeles
Musical groups with year of establishment missing
Musical groups with year of disestablishment missing
American experimental musical groups